Robert Sastre (born 7 Jun 1926 in Grand-Popo; died 2000) was a Beninese clergyman and bishop for the Roman Catholic Diocese of Lokossa. He became ordained in 1952 and was appointed bishop in 1972.

References

20th-century Roman Catholic bishops in Benin
1926 births
2000 deaths
People from Mono Department
Roman Catholic bishops of Lokossa